Bones of Contention is a 1936 short story collection by Frank O'Connor featuring the following stories:

Michael's Wife
Orpheus and His Lute
Peasants
In the Train
The Majesty of the Law
Tears - Idle Tears
Lofty
The Man That Stopped
The English Soldier
Bones of Contention
What's Wrong With the Country?
A Romantic

References

1936 short story collections
Short story collections by Frank O'Connor
Works by Frank O'Connor